The fly family Chloropidae contains over 160 described genera. These include:

Afrocelyphus
Apallates
Aphanotrigonum
Apotropina
Arcuator
Assuania
Biorbitella
Cadrema
Calamoncosis
Camarota
Capnoptera
Caviceps
Centorisoma
Cetema
Chaetochlorops
Chlorops
Chloropsina
Conioscinella
Cryptonevra
Dasyopa
Dicraeus
Diplotoxa
Diplotoxoides
Dysartia
Ectecephala
Elachiptera
Elachiptereicus
Elliponeura
Epichlorops
Eribolus
Eugaurax
Eurina
Eutropha
Fiebrigella
Gampsocera
Gaurax
Hapleginella
Hippelates
Homalura
Homaluroides
Incertella
Lagaroceras
Lasiambia
Lasiosina
Liohippelates
Lipara
Malloewia
Melanochaeta
Melanum
Meromyza
Metopostigma
Microcercis
Monochaetoscinella
Neodiplotoxa
Neohaplegis
Neoscinella
Olcella
Opetiophora
Oscinella
Oscinimorpha
Oscinisoma
Oscinoides
Paraeurina
Parectecephala
Phyladelphus
Platycephala
Platycephalisca
Polyodaspis
Pseudogaurax
Pseudopachychaeta
Rhodesiella
Rhopalopterum
Sacatonia
Sabroskyina
Scoliophthalmus
Siphonella
Siphonellopsis
Siphunculina
Speccafrons
Stenoscinis
Strobliola
Thaumatomyia
Trachysiphonella
Trichieurina
Tricimba
Trigonomma
Xena

References 

 Europe
 Nearctic

 List
Chloropidae